Lady Edwina Louise Grosvenor (born 4 November 1981) is an English criminologist, philanthropist and prison reformer. She is a founder and a trustee of the charity The Clink, and founder of the charity One Small Thing. She is the sister of Hugh Grosvenor, 7th Duke of Westminster.

Early life and education 
Lady Edwina Louise Grosvenor was born at Eaton Hall, Cheshire, on 4 November 1981. She is the daughter of the 6th Duke of Westminster and Natalia Ayesha Phillips. Through her mother, she is descended from the Romanov imperial family of Russia and the Russian writer Alexander Pushkin, as well as from the latter's great-grandfather – African tribal chief turned Russian nobleman Abram Petrovich Hannibal. Grosvenor's godmother was Diana, Princess of Wales. She went to a co-educational school in the Wirral. At the age of 12, she was taken to a Liverpool rehabilitation centre, where she was introduced to heroin addicts and became interested in helping society's unseen people. At the age of 15, she volunteered in a homeless shelter organised by Save the Family charity. She spent her gap year working in a prison in Kathmandu before studying criminology at Northumbria University. In Nepal she worked to help innocent children get out of prison. She studied criminal behaviour at Edith Cowan University in Perth, Australia. In August 2021, Grosvenor graduated from Solent University with a master’s degree in criminology and crime scene management achieving a distinction.

Career

Prison reform 
During her time in Nepal, she worked for The Esther Benjamin's Trust, a charity which were trying to get innocent children removed from prison. She also spent her time working at the Central Jail in Kathmandu. Lady Edwina commissioned research by Corston Coalition into the needs of women offenders. She spent a year as a support worker for the HM Prison Styal. After spent time in Styal, she worked in HM Prison Garth and helping with the restorative justice programme. She sits on the Advisory Board for Female Offenders under the Secretary of State for Justice. From 2007 until 2010, Grosvenor became an adviser for James Jones, when he was Bishop of Liverpool and Bishop for Prisoners in the House of Lords. In 2009, Grosvenor became the founding investor of The Clink, a British charity that identifies the training and support needed for prisoners to find jobs following release.  The Clink restaurant, a fine-dining training restaurant, opened in HM Prison High Down in 2009. She became a trustee of the charity in 2011, before stepping down as a trustee in 2018. After stepping down, she serves as one of The Clink ambassadors. She presented the BBC Radio 4 Charity Appeal for the Prisoners' Advice Service in 2014. 

In 2015, Grosvenor visited Ellesmere College and delivered a speech about prison reform and rehabilitation. She founded One Small Thing, a charity that seeks to understand the trauma within the prison system and to raise awareness of how compassion and respect can prevent women from reoffending. One Small Things trains prison staff about trauma, helps them change their behaviour to protect women inmates, and develops trauma services within prisons. Edwina founded the Becoming Trauma Informed programme across smaller women's prison estate in England and Wales. In September 2017, One Small Thing collaborated with the Rumi Foundation to research women's prisons around the country. Grosvenor is a trustee of the Centre for Mental Health, and has established trauma informed mental health workshops in women's prisons. She is an ambassador of the No Way Trust which educates school students to the realities of prison life, crime and consequence. Grosvenor hosts the podcast named Justice, where she discusses the environment of British prisons. Grosvenor became a member on the advisory board to the Centre for Criminology in the Faculty of Law at the University of Oxford. She also donated £90,000 to the University of Oxford to fund the Death Penalty Research Unit in 2020. She is a member of the Vice Chancellor's Circle of Benefactors of the University of Oxford's Faculty of Law. Lady Edwina works on a project called Hope Street, a healing community alternative for women who were in custody prior to sentencing or already served their sentences alongside their children. She also works with Pathways, a London-based community regeneration programme to create sustainable businesses run by former offenders.

Other ventures and advocacy 
She is a founding member of the Global Philanthropic Advisory Board in January 2022. She is a patron of Paladin, a non-profit stalking advocacy service.

In March 2022, Grosvenor became the High Sheriff of Hampshire.

Recognition 
One Small Thing were awarded the Howard League for Penal Reform's Criminal Justice Champion Award in 2018. In July 2018, Edwina was awarded an honorary fellowship of Liverpool John Moores University for her contribution to public life.

Personal life 
Grosvenor married British television presenter Dan Snow on 27 November 2010 at Bishop's Lodge in Woolton, Liverpool in an Anglican ceremony performed by James Jones, Bishop of Liverpool. They have three children:
 Zia Snow (b. 13 October 2011)
 Wolf Robert Snow (b. 9 September 2014)
 Orla Snow (b. December 2015)

In June 2013, Edwina miscarried six months into her pregnancy.

References 

Living people
1981 births
Daughters of English dukes
Edwina
Alumni of Northumbria University
Edith Cowan University alumni
English philanthropists
Founders of charities
People from Cheshire
Prison reformers
English women philanthropists
English people of Russian descent
English people of German descent